Luncani or Luncanii may refer to:

Several villages in Romania:
 Luncani, a village in Mărgineni Commune, Bacău County
 Luncani, a village in Luna Commune, Cluj County
 Luncani, a village in the city of Toplița, Harghita County
 Luncani, a village in Boșorod Commune, Hunedoara County
 Luncanii de Jos and Luncanii de Sus, villages in Tomești Commune, Timiș County
Valea Luncanilor, a river in Hunedoara County, Romania